Pedro Dias may refer to:

 Pedro Dias (footballer, born 1973), Portuguese football manager and former forward
 Pedro Dias (judoka) (born 1982), Portuguese judoka
 Pedro Dias (footballer, born 1992), Brazilian football forward

See also
 Pedro Díaz (disambiguation)